Gertrude Woodcock Seibert (November 16, 1864 – June 13, 1928) was an American writer. Initially known for her poetry, she became a compiler of religious texts.

Biography
Gertrude Antonette (or "Antoinette") Woodcock was born in Altoona, Pennsylvania, November 16, 1864. Her parents were Samuel M. Woodcock, a lawyer, and Elizabeth (Etnier) Woodcock. 

She graduated from Altoona High School (1880), and Wellesley College (B.S., 1885).

On September 18, 1890, in Altoona, she married Robert S. Seibert who later became president of East Shade Gap Railroad Company, Rockhill Iron and Coal Company, and Shade Gap Railroad Company. 

Since 1894, Seibert was engaged in non-denominational Bible study and private lectures on religious topics. She prepared questions for the Bureau of Bibly Study. She compiled Daily Heavenly Manna for the Household of Faith, and translated into German, Swedish, and Norwegian. She compiled an Instructor's Guide and Berean Topical Index for the Berean Bible, 1907.

Seibert contributed to various newspapers (religious articles exclusively) and wrote religious poems and hymns. In 1909, she published the booklet, Sweet Brier Rose (500,000 printed). In 1912, she compiled Poems of Dawn. She also published the booklet (illustrated form), In the Garden of the Lord. Seibert did considerable art work in the line of decorated and illustrated motto cards; a 1905 design of chestnut burrs, illustrating "In Due Time", was printed in an edition of 15,000.

Seibert was an active member of the international Bible Students' Association. In religions, she was nondenominational. Seibert was opposed to woman suffrage on Scriptural grounds.

Gertrude Seibert died June 13, 1928, at Miami Beach, Florida.

Selected works
 Berean Bible Teachers' Manual, 19??
 In the Garden of the Lord, 1905
 Daily heavenly Manna for the household offaith: a collection , 1907
 Niebiańska manna czyli rozmyślania duchowe na każdy dzień roku dla domowników wiary, 1907
 The Sweet-brier Rose and Other Poems, 1909
 Daglig himmelsk manna for troens husstand: et udvalg af ..., 1911
 Poems of Dawn, 1912

References

1864 births
1928 deaths
People from Altoona, Pennsylvania
20th-century American poets
American religious writers
20th-century American women writers
Writers from Pennsylvania
Wellesley College alumni